Stanley Peiris (12 June 1941 – 13 October 2002) was a Sri Lankan musician and musical composer.

Early life
Stanley Peiris was born in Kandy on 12 June 1941 and attended St. Anthony's College, Kandy. He learnt music at the Kandy M.G.C. institute and later joined the Sri Lanka Navy. He then formed a music group, Fortunes, which specialised in performing instrumental music, an innovative idea in the Sinhala pop scene.

Music
His musical career spanned more than forty years and he produced over 700 albums and composed scores for about 6,600 songs. Some of his popular melodies include; Lata Walpola's "Punsanda Eliyai", Milton Mallawarachchi's "Amaran Hengum", Clarence Wijewardena's "Duwa Ma Wage", Gration Amanda's "Tharu Yaye" and Nirosha Virajini's "Sigiri Geeyak Obe Hadawathe".

In 1981 he composed music for the film Saranga and then for films including Soora Saradiel and Baisikalaya. Peiris was teaching at St. Anthony's College, Kandy, where Rookantha Gunathilake was one of his students. Peiris then formed Galaxy, with Gunathilake, Mahinda Bandara and Keerthi Pasqual. Peiris helped composer Dinesh Subasinghe at the beginning of his music career in 2000. He has also collaborated with Pandit W. D. Amaradeva.

Selected compositions 

 - T.M. Jayarathna
Hanga Gal Leney -H.R. Jothipala
 - Chandrika Siriwardhana
 - Victor Rathnayake
 - Nanda Malini
Peda Pasi Soyala - Abewardhana Balasooriya
 - Milton Mallawarachchi
 - Priya Suriyasena
 - Sujatha Athanayaka
 - Greshan Ananda
 - Keerthi Pasquel
 - Chandraleka Perera
 - Niranjala Sarojini
 - Raj Senivirathna
 - Rookantha Gunathilaka
 - Clarance Wijewardhana
 - Sanath Nandasiri
 - W.D. Amaradeva
 - Nirosha Virajini
 - Rohana Bogoda
 - Raju Bandara
 - Jayantha Disanayaka
 - Athula Adhikari
 - Nelu Adhikari
 - Neela Wickramasinghe & Mervin Perera

Death
Peiris died from cancer on 13 October 2002, at his residence in Kandy.

References

2002 deaths
1941 births
Sri Lankan Roman Catholics
Sinhalese musicians
Alumni of St. Anthony's College, Kandy
Sri Lankan composers
Sri Lankan saxophonists
Musicians from Kandy
20th-century saxophonists